John G. Frank (June 24, 1831 – ?) was an American from Jackson, Wisconsin who served a single one-year term in 1879 as a Democratic member of the Wisconsin State Assembly from Washington County. succeeding Cornelius Coughlin.

In 1879 he lost the Democratic nomination, and ran as an "Independent Democrat" against the official Democratic nominee, Jacob C. Place. He lost to Place, who polled 650 votes to 549 votes for Republican F. Hildebrandt and 470 for Frank.

References 

People from Jackson, Washington County, Wisconsin
1831 births
Year of death missing
Democratic Party members of the Wisconsin State Assembly